DeLand Municipal Airport , also known as Sidney H. Taylor Field, is a city-owned public-use airport located three nautical miles (5 km) northeast of the central business district of DeLand, a city in Volusia County, Florida, United States.

This airport is assigned a three-letter location identifier of DED by the Federal Aviation Administration, but it does not have an International Air Transport Association (IATA) airport code (the IATA assigned DED to Jolly Grant Airport in Dehra Dun, India).

History

Military use

The city first began developing the airport in the 1920s, with the first asphalt runway laid around 1936.  In 1942, the City of DeLand donated the facility to the U.S. Navy. It was renamed Naval Air Station DeLand on November 17, 1942.

Following extensive military construction, NAS DeLand's primary focus was advanced training for Navy flight crews in land-based PBO Ventura and PB4Y-2 Privateer patrol bombers, and carrier-based SBD Dauntless dive bombers.  Several of the U.S. Navy's former and present day maritime patrol and reconnaissance (VP) squadrons operating the P-3 Orion trace their squadron lineage to being initially established at NAS DeLand during World War II.

In 1944, training in the carrier-based F6F Hellcat fighter was added to NAS DeLand's mission.

Nine Mile Point on Lake George was also under NAS DeLand's control, and was used as a practice bombing site with a Navy PBY Catalina seaplane stationed nearby in the event of an aircraft mishap on the lake. This Lake George site is still used today as part of the Navy's Pinecastle Electronic Warfare and Bombing Range managed by NAS Jacksonville.

NAS DeLand was decommissioned following the end of World War II, its control tower closed, and control of the airfield returned to the City of DeLand. Numerous former military buildings remain standing as part of the airport's industrial park and the Naval Air Station DeLand Museum.

Current use
Today, the airport serves as an uncontrolled general aviation reliever airport to commercial operations at Daytona Beach International Airport (DAB), Orlando Sanford International Airport (SFB) and Orlando International Airport (MCO). In 2007, an analysis was completed for the possible establishment of an FAA Level 1 air traffic control tower at DED under the FAA's Contract Tower Program.

Facilities and aircraft 

For the 12-month period ending May 7, 2002, the airport had 77,710 aircraft operations, an average of 212 per day: 99% general aviation, 1% air taxi and <1% military. There are 162 aircraft based at this airport: 70% single-engine, 23% multi-engine, 2% jet, 4% helicopter and 1% ultralight.

References

External links 

 DeLand Airport at city website
  brochure from CFASPP
 

Airports in Volusia County, Florida
DeLand, Florida